Kerteminde (nickname: Min Amandas by, i.e. My Amanda's town), is a town in central Denmark, located in Kerteminde Municipality on the island of Funen. The town has a population of 6,042 (1 January 2022). It is a small harbor town surrounded by farms. Kerteminde contains a fish restaurant, Rudolf Mathis, the Viking museum Ladby, and the research and exhibition institution for fish and porpoises Fjord & Bælt.

Notable people

Painters 
 Frederik Storch (1805 in Kerteminde – 1883) a Danish genre painter
 Johannes Larsen (1867 in Kerteminde – 1961) a nature painter, one of the Funen Painters
 Anna Syberg (1870–1914) a Funen painter, lived in Pilegården near Kerteminde from 1902
 Christine Swane (1876 in Kerteminde – 1960) one of the Funen Painters then developed a Cubist style
 Axel P. Jensen (1885 in Kerteminde – 1972) a painter of landscapes with stronger colouring than the Funen Painters
 Alfred Simonsen (1906 in Kølstrup, near Kerteminde – 1935) a painter, one of the Odsherred Painters
 Ernst Syberg (1906 in Kerteminde – 1981) a painter, became one of the Odsherred Painters 
 Birthe Bovin (1906 in Kerteminde – 1980) a self-taught Danish painter, became one of Odsherred Painters

Other arts 
 Frederik Paludan-Müller (1809 in Kerteminde – 1876) a Danish poet  
 Arent Nicolai Dragsted (1821 in Kerteminde – 1898) a Danish goldsmith
 Franz Syberg (1904 in Kerteminde - 1955) a composer and organist at Kerteminde, 1932-1955
 Henning Ipsen (1930-1984) Danish novelist and translator 
 Annette Strøyberg (1936 in Rynkeby, near Kerteminde – 2005) a Danish actress 
 Torbjørn C. Pedersen (born 1978 in Kerteminde) a Danish traveller and adventurer

Sport 
 Oliver Christensen (born 1999 in Kerteminde) a professional footballer
 Niels Petersen (1918 in Kerteminde – 1966) a weightlifter, competed at the 1948 Summer Olympics
 Jan Eli Andersen (born 1966 in Kerteminde) a sailor, competed at the 1996 Summer Olympics
 Niclas Vemmelund (born 1992 in Kerteminde) a Danish football defender

International relations

Twin towns and sister cities
Kerteminde is twinned with:

See also
 Korshavn, Denmark

References

External links
Kerteminde municipality

 
Municipal seats of the Region of Southern Denmark
Municipal seats of Denmark
Cities and towns in the Region of Southern Denmark
Kerteminde Municipality
Populated places in Funen
1410s establishments in Denmark